Schismatomma pericleum is a species of fungus belonging to the family Roccellaceae.

It is native to Eurasia and Northern America.

References

Arthoniomycetes